Osteochilus salsburyi is a species of cyprinid fish found in Laos, northern Vietnam, and southern China.

Named in honor of physician Clarence G. Salsbury (1885-1980), American Presbyterian Mission of Hainan, for his interest and aid in Nichols’ work.

References

Taxa named by John Treadwell Nichols
Taxa named by Clifford H. Pope
Fish described in 1927
Osteochilus